Reporting may refer to
 any activity that leads to reports

 in particular business reporting
Data reporting
Sustainability reporting
Financial reporting
 international reporting of financial information for tax purposes under the OECD's Common Reporting Standard
Journalism
Court reporting
Traffic reporting
Beat reporting
Operational reporting